Jiy (also, Zhiy and Juy) is a village and municipality in the Yardymli Rayon of Azerbaijan.  It has a population of 218.

References 

Populated places in Yardimli District